Sjöfolk och landkrabbor (English: Sea people and land crabs) is an album by the Swedish folk singer-songwriter and guitar player Fred Åkerström. He sings Nordic songs in arrangements of Anders Ekdahl.

Track listing
 Båklandets Vackra Maja 2:58
 Nödhamn 3:05
 Katinka, Katinka 3:01
 Sjömanskistan 4:02
 Han Hade Seglat För Om Masten 2:29
 Den Sorte Seiler 3:50
 Stängd Teater 3:58
 Sören Bramfris Laerkesang 3:14
 Luffarevisa 3:30
 Storbynatt 3:53
 Nordsjön 6:35

External links
 Lyrics

References

1978 albums
Fred Åkerström albums
Swedish-language albums